Marie Laurencin (31 October 1883 – 8 June 1956) was a French painter and printmaker. She became an important figure in the Parisian avant-garde as a member of the Cubists associated with the Section d'Or.

Biography
Laurencin was born in Paris, where she was raised by her mother and lived much of her life. At 18, she studied porcelain painting in Sèvres. She then returned to Paris and continued her art education at the Académie Humbert, where she changed her focus to oil painting.

During the early years of the 20th century, Laurencin was an important figure in the Parisian avant-garde. A member of both the circle of Pablo Picasso, and Cubists associated with the Section d'Or, such as Jean Metzinger, Albert Gleizes, Robert Delaunay, Henri le Fauconnier and Francis Picabia, exhibiting with them at the Salon des Indépendants (1910-1911) and the Salon d'Automne (1911-1912), and Galeries Dalmau (1912) at the first Cubist exhibition in Spain. She became romantically involved with the poet Guillaume Apollinaire, and has often been identified as his muse. In addition, Laurencin had important connections to the salon of the American expatriate and lesbian writer Natalie Clifford Barney. She had relationships with men and women, and her art reflected her life, her "balletic wraiths" and "sidesaddle Amazons" providing the art world with her brand of "queer femme with a Gallic twist."

During the First World War, Laurencin left France for exile in Spain with her German-born husband, Baron Otto von Waëtjen, since through her marriage she had automatically lost her French citizenship. The couple subsequently lived together briefly in Düsseldorf. She was greatly affected by her separation from the French capital, the unrivaled center of artistic creativity. After they divorced in 1920, she returned to Paris, where she achieved financial success as an artist until the economic depression of the 1930s. During the 1930s she worked as an art instructor at a private school. She lived in Paris until her death.

Work
Laurencin's works include paintings, watercolors, drawings, and prints. She is known as one of the few female Cubist painters, with Sonia Delaunay, Marie Vorobieff, and Franciska Clausen. While her work shows the influence of Cubist painters Pablo Picasso and Georges Braque, who was her close friend, she developed a unique approach to abstraction which often centered on the representation of groups of women and animals. Her work lies outside the bounds of Cubist norms in her pursuit of a specifically feminine aesthetic by her use of pastel colors and curvilinear forms. Originally influenced by Fauvism, she simplified her forms through the influence of the Cubist painters. From 1910, her palette consisted mainly of grey, pink and pastel tones.

Her distinctive style developed upon her return to Paris in the 1920s post exile. The muted colours and the geometric patterns inherited from Cubism were replaced by light tones and undulating compositions. Her signature motif is marked by willowy, ethereal female figures, and a palette of soft pastel colours, evoking an enchanted world.

Laurencin continued to explore themes of femininity and what she considered to be feminine modes of representation until her death. Her works include paintings, watercolors, drawings, and prints.

Collections
Laurencin's artistic accomplishments are seen in collections around the world. On the 100th anniversary of her birth in 1983, the Musée Marie Laurencin opened in Nagano, Japan. To date, the Musée Marie Laurencin is the only museum in the world that solely contains the art of a female painter. Founder Masahiro Takano was enamored with Laurencin's sensual and lyrical worldview, and the museum holds over 600 art pieces by her. 

Laurencin's work is also found in The Museum of Modern Art in New York, the Hermitage Museum in St. Petersburg, and the Tate Gallery in London. Her work is also shown in the permanent collection of the Musée de l'Orangerie gallery in Paris, France, housing some of her most famous pieces.

Notes

References
 Birnbaum, Paula J. Women Artists in Interwar France: Framing Femininities, Aldershot, Ashgate, 2011.
 Gere, Charlotte. Marie Laurencin, London - Paris, Flammarion, 1977
 Groult, Flora. Marie Laurencin, Paris, Mercure de France, 1987
 Kahn, Elizabeth Louise. "Marie Laurencin: Une Femme Inadaptée" in Feminist Histories of Art Ashgate Publishing, 2003.
 Marchesseau, Daniel. Marie Laurencin, Tokyo, éd. Kyuryudo & Paris, Hazan, 1981
 Marchesseau, Daniel. Marie Laurencin, Catalogue raisonné de l'œuvre gravé, Tokyo, éd. Kyuryudo, 1981
 Marchesseau, Daniel. Marie Laurencin, Catalogue raisonné de l'œuvre peint, 2 vol. Tokyo, éd. Musée Marie Laurencin, 1985 & 1999
 Marchesseau, Daniel. Marie Laurencin, Cent Œuvres du musée Marie Laurencin, Martigny, Fondation Pierre Gianadda, 1993
 Marchesseau, Daniel, Marie Laurencin, Paris, Musée Marmottan Monet / Hazan, 2013
 
 Pierre, José. Marie Laurencin, Paris, France-Loisirs, 1988
 
 
 

Archives
 Fonds Marie Laurencin, Bibliothèque littéraire Jacques Doucet, Université de Paris

External links

 

 Marie Laurencin Bio - Findlay Galleries
 Marielaurencin.com 
 Musée Marie Laurencin, Japan.
 Artcyclopedia.com: Marie Laurencin

1883 births
1956 deaths
French women painters
20th-century engravers
Artists from Paris
French engravers
French women printmakers
Bisexual women
Bisexual painters
French LGBT painters
Modern painters
Modern printmakers
Cubist artists
Burials at Père Lachaise Cemetery
20th-century French women artists
20th-century French printmakers
Muses
Women engravers